"Take a Little Ride" is a song written by Dylan Altman, Rodney Clawson and Jim McCormick and recorded by American country music artist Jason Aldean. It was released on July 16, 2012, as the first single from his fifth studio album Night Train.

Content
The song "Take a Little Ride" revolves around the happenings of a man getting off work, and going to pick up his love interest that night to take her out for a drive in his Chevy truck. It is in the key of E minor with a chord pattern of E-G-D-A.

Eight days after the song's release, Broken Bow Records released a re-recording of the song, in which the line "a little Shiner Bock" is changed to "a couple Rocky Tops", in reference to Coors beer. This re-recording was done because Aldean had signed an endorsement deal with Coors.

Critical reception
Billy Dukes of Taste of Country gave "Take a Little Ride" a four-star review, praising the song's "colorful" and "welcoming" verses, and stating how "ballads like 'Laughed Until We Cried' balance rockers like 'She's Country,' but he’s at his best on songs that find the sweet middle". It received three out of five stars from Jessica Nicholson of Country Weekly, who thought that the lyrics were "a little generic" but said that the "in-your-face production and signature Southern rock groove combine to make this unmistakably Jason's."

Matt Bjorke of Roughstock gave the song a four-star review, saying that Aldean was "relaxed, confident, and deliver[ed] a song that fits exactly what we've come to expect from a superstar."

Music video
The music video was directed by Shaun Silva and premiered on August 10, 2012.

Chart performance
"Take a Little Ride" debuted at number 19 on the Billboard Country Songs chart for the week of August 4, 2012. It also debuted on the Billboard Hot 100 chart at number 12, and the Canadian Hot 100 chart at number 22 the same week, Aldean's highest debut in Canada thus far. The song also made history on Country Digital Songs, moving 189,000 downloads during the tracking week ending July 22, marking the biggest opening week by a male artist.  On the country chart dated October 6, 2012, "Take a Little Ride" became his eighth number-one single. The song has sold over a million digital downloads as of January 2013.

Year-end charts

Certifications

References

2012 singles
Jason Aldean songs
BBR Music Group singles
Songs written by Rodney Clawson
Songs written by Jim McCormick (songwriter)
Music videos directed by Shaun Silva
Song recordings produced by Michael Knox (record producer)
2012 songs
Songs about cars